Patrick (Pat) McGuigan (10 February 1935 – 27 June 1987) was an Irish singer born in Clones, County Monaghan.

McGuigan, who spelled his name McGeegan for the stage, first came to prominence in Ireland when his single with the Big Four reached number 7 in the Irish charts in 1963. Five years later he was again in the national spotlight in 1968, when he competed for Ireland at the Eurovision Song Contest (as Pat McGeegan) with the song Chance of a Lifetime, arriving in fourth place. The song spent one week at number-one in the Irish Singles Chart in April 1968. Subsequently, he made some albums and released many singles, but never reached the Irish top twenty again. His rendition of Danny Boy became well known. McGuigan was also a respected songwriter.

His son, Barry McGuigan, was world featherweight boxing champion in 1985–1986. Pat McGuigan became known in the United States after his son's world title winning victory over Eusebio Pedroza. On 13 June 1986, he sang the American national anthem before the world championship bout between Carlos Santos and Buster Drayton in New Jersey.

Pat McGuigan died after a period of illness in 1987. He was 52 years old.

References

1987 deaths
Eurovision Song Contest entrants for Ireland
Eurovision Song Contest entrants of 1968
Irish male singer-songwriters
1935 births
Musicians from County Monaghan
20th-century Irish male singers